The 12245 / 46 Howrah–SMVT Bengaluru Duronto Express is a Duronto Express train of Indian Railways – South Eastern Railway zone that runs between  in Kolkata, West Bengal and SMVT Bengaluru in Bengaluru, Karnataka, both in India.

It operates as train number 12245 from Howrah Junction to SMVT Bengaluru Junction and as train number 12246 in the reverse direction, serving the states of Karnataka, Andhra Pradesh, Odisha & West Bengal. It runs with highly refurbished LHB coach from 11 March 2020. It has been provided with pure Duronto-liveried sleeper coaches.

Coaches

The 12245 / 46 Howrah–SMVT Bengaluru Duronto Express presently has 1 AC First Class, 1 AC 2 tier, 5 AC 3 AC tier, 11 Sleeper class and 2 EOG coaches. In addition, it carries a pantry car.

As is customary with most train services in India, coach composition may be amended at the discretion of Indian Railways depending on demand. Its LHB coaches replaced Hybrid LHB coach on 13 March 2020 from Howrah..

Service

As the average speed of the train is above , as per Indian Railways rules, its fare includes a Superfast Express surcharge.

Food

Routeing & Halts 

Locomotive

It is powered by a -based WAP-7 for its entire journey.

Timings

12245 Howrah–SMVT Bengaluru Duronto Express leaves Howrah Junction at 10:50 AM every Tuesday, Wednesday, Friday, Saturday & Sunday and reaches SIR M VISVESVARAYA TERMINAL BENGALURU (SMVB) the next day at 3:50 PM.
12246 SMVT Bengaluru–Howrah Duronto Express leaves SIR M VISVESVARAYA TERMINAL BENGALURU (SMVB) at 11:20 AM every Monday, Tuesday, Thursday, Friday & Sunday and reaches Howrah Junction the next day at 4:50 PM.

Speed
Sometimes people become confused because according to Indian Railways Permanent Way Manual (IRPWM) on Indian Railways website or Indian Railway Institute of Civil Engineering website, the BG (Broad Gauge) lines have been classified into six groups ‘A’ to ‘E’ on the basis of the future maximum permissible speeds but it may not be same as present speed.
It runs through Howrah Chennai route up to Gudur. Howrah – Andul 110 kmph, Andul- Kharagpur 130 kmph. As per a post on Facebook page of DCM Kharagpur on 19 Nov, 2022, which is shared by Facebook page of DRM kharagpur whose link  is available on South Eastern Railway Website -  Kharagpur to Bhadrak is 130 kmph , Bhadrak - Duvada (DVD) - Vijayawada  110 kmph but work under progress for 130 kmph sectional speed, Vijayawada - Gudur has been increased to 130 kmph or will be increased to 130 kmph very soon,  Katpadi – Jolarpettai 110 kmph but 130 kmph is proposed, Jolarpettai to BAIYYAPPANAHALLI JN. (BYPL), where it leaves route towards KSR Bengaluru to go to SIR M VISVESVARAYA TERMINAL BENGALURU (SMVB) is 110 kmph.

References

External links

Trains from Howrah Junction railway station
Transport in Bangalore
Rail transport in Howrah
Duronto Express trains
Rail transport in Karnataka
Rail transport in Andhra Pradesh
Rail transport in Odisha
Rail transport in West Bengal